Midnight Peak is located in the Kananaskis River valley along Highway 40 in the Canadian Rockies of Alberta.

See also
Mountains of Alberta

References

Midnight Peak
Alberta's Rockies